I Spy a Spy is an original musical with music by Sohee Youn, lyrics by Jamie Jackson, and book by Youn & Jackson. The original Off-Broadway production began previews on July 6 and had an official opening night on July 18 Off-Broadway at the St Clements Theatre.  The original production ended its limited engagement early on August 10 after 10 previews and 26 regular performances.

Development
Over the course of 7 years, the musical went through 6 readings and 3 workshops. The musical held development lab presentations on March 21 and 22, 2019.

Original production
The World Premiere/Off-Broadway production was produced by two time Tony Award Nominated Producer Eric Krebs and is directed and choreographed by Bill Castellino.  The creative team features musical director Dan Pardo, set designer James Morgan, costume designer Tyler Holland, lighting designer Michael Gottlieb, sound designer Dave Ferdinand, associate director Joseph Hayward, and assistant choreographer Victoria Casillo. Casting is by Michael Cassara, CSA.

Musical numbers
Source:

 Act 1
 The American Dream – The Company
 You Will See Me – Jose, Alina
 If I Could Be You – Jose, Alina
 This City's Gone to Hell – Sunny, Abdul
 Is It Just Me – Jose and Company
 Home – Jose
 Fresh Meat – Alina, Influencers
 You Looked at Me – Jose

 Act 2
 Where Love Goes Wrong – Jose, Alina, Sunny, Abdul and Company
 Natural Assets – Prisciliana and her gang
 I Spy a Spy – Jose and Company
 I Spy a Spy/Natural Assets (reprise) – Jose, Alina and Company
 So Long – Alina, Female Ensemble
 Only a Russian – Cold Borscht, Beef Stroganoff, Russian Agents
 Finale – The Company

Roles and original cast
Source:

Reception
The world premiere received mixed reviews from both audiences and critics.

References

External links
 

2019 musicals
Off-Broadway musicals